Institute of Physics is a London-based professional association for physicists.

Institute of Physics may also refer to:

 American Institute of Physics
 Australian Institute of Physics
 Helsinki Institute of Physics
 Institute of Physics of the Czech Academy of Sciences
 Institute of Physics, Bhubaneswar, Odisha, India
 Institute of Physics, Chinese Academy of Sciences
 Pakistan Institute of Physics
 National Institute of Physics, Philippines
 The Racah Institute of Physics

See also
 Institute of Nuclear Physics (disambiguation)
 Institute for Theoretical Physics (disambiguation)